Charles d'Angoulême may refer to:
Charles, Count of Angoulême (1459–1496)
Charles II de Valois, Duke of Orléans (1522–1545)
Charles de Valois, Duke of Angoulême (1573–1650)